The Men's individual pursuit competition at the 2021 UCI Track Cycling World Championships was held on 22 October 2021.

Results

Qualifying
The Qualifying was started at 14:37. The two fasters riders will race for gold and the third and fourth fastest riders will race for bronze.

Finals
The finals were started at 20:36.

References

Men's individual pursuit